The Korea Life Insurance Association, or KLIA, is a South Korean insurance association.

Members
Hanhwa Daehan Life Insurance
Korea Allianz Life
Samsung Life
Heungkook Life
Kyobo Life
LIG
Mirae Asset
Kumho Life
Dongbu Life
Tongyang Orion Life Insurance
Korea Met Life Company
Korea Prudential Life
Shinhan SH&C Life Insurance
Korea PCA Life
Korea New York Life Insurance
Korea ING Life
Hana HSBC Life
Lina Life
AIG Korea Insurance
Nok Sip Ja Life Insurance
KB Life
Korean-Re LIfe Insurance

See also
Life insurance
Economy of South Korea

External links
 Korea Life Insurance Association Homepage

Insurance companies of South Korea
Life insurance companies